The Sky Has Fallen is a 2009 American horror film written and directed by Doug Roos. It stars Carey MacLaren and Laurel Kemper as two survivors of a gruesome apocalypse.

Plot 
An Ebola-like plague decimates the world's population. Attempting to escape infection, people flee to rural locations but strange demonic figures appear, transforming the dead into their army. The two main characters, Lance and Rachel, try to hunt down the leader of these creatures before humanity gets wiped out.

Cast 
 Carey MacLaren as Lance
 Laurel Kemper as Rachel
 Cory Knisely as The Leader
 Nathan Shelton as Chilton

Production 
The film was shot in Missouri with a wide range of influences including Versus and The Exorcist. The opening shots of a large city were actually done in Tokyo, Japan. The film is known for containing all practical effects without any CGI.

Release 
The original cut of The Sky Has Fallen premiered at the British Film Festival Los Angeles.  It was independently distributed on DVD on February 16, 2010.  New footage was shot in 2011 and again in 2014, resulting in three very different versions of the film with the latest being an 80-minute Ultimate Edition that came out in June 2015.

Reception 
Matt Boiselle of Dread Central rated it a 4/5, calling the film "a very large win for independent cinema in my opinion and isn’t a film that should be passed by."  HorrorNews.net gave it "7 zombies" out of 10, writing there is "some really creative stuff going on in this film."  Bella Blitz of The Horror Honeys was "pleasantly surprised" with a score of 3 out of 5, adding, "Seriously though, so much blood. It was awesome."  Richard Martin at UK Horror Scene described it as a "character driven, unique and well shot piece of work no doubt" with "practical effects to rival that of AAA Hollywood titles."  Roger DeMarco of Repulsive Reviews called it "one of the gnarliest films I have seen in recent history," adding that it was "on par with Raimi’s The Evil Dead."  Mark Miller of Ain't It Cool News wrote that it was "genuinely creepy and downright scary."  Brian Kirst of Horror Society said it was "a visual marvel" that "creates both a sympathetic point of view and a world of oozing horror as well." Bella Blitz of The Horror Honeys pointed out that the film has "elements of revenge, monsters, slasher, and splatter genres combined."

Awards

References

External links 
 

2009 films
2009 horror films
2009 independent films
2000s science fiction horror films
American science fiction horror films
American post-apocalyptic films
American zombie films
American independent films
2009 directorial debut films
2000s English-language films
2000s American films